Mšené-lázně is a spa municipality and village in Litoměřice District in the Ústí nad Labem Region of the Czech Republic. It has about 1,800 inhabitants.

Administrative parts
Villages of Brníkov, Ječovice, Podbradec, Ředhošť and Vrbice are administrative parts of Mšené-lázně.

Geography
It lies in a flat and mainly agricultural landscape of the Lower Eger Table. The Mšenský Stream flows through the municipality.

History

The first written mention of Mšené is from 1262.

Spa
Mšené Spa was founded in 1796. The local water is rich in iron and other minerals. The spa treat especially disorders of muscular system and nerves.

Sights
Among the landmarks of the municipality belong Mšené Castle, Chapel of the Saint John of Nepomuk, and the town hall.

Notable people
Antonín Hudeček (1872–1941), landscape painter

Gallery

References

External links

Villages in Litoměřice District
Spa towns in the Czech Republic